MS-DOS / PC DOS and some related disk operating systems use the files mentioned here.

System Files:
IO.SYS (or IBMBIO.COM): This contains the system initialization code and builtin device drivers.
MSDOS.SYS (or IBMDOS.COM): This contains the DOS kernel.

Command-line interpreter (Shell):
COMMAND.COM: This is the command interpreter.

User configuration files:
AUTOEXEC.BAT: This is run by the default shell (usually COMMAND.COM) to execute commands at startup.
CONFIG.SYS: This contains statements to configure DOS and load device drivers.

Standard DOS utility programs:

APPEND: Set a search path for data files.
ASSIGN: Redirect requests for disk operations on one drive to a different drive. 
ATTRIB: Set or display file attributes.
BACKUP / RESTORE: simple backup and restore utilities.
CHKDSK: Check disk for file system integrity.
COMP: File compare utility.
DEBUG: Simple command line debugger.
DELTREE: Delete a directory tree.
DISKCOMP: Compare floppy disks.
DISKCOPY: Copy floppy disks.
DOSKEY: Command line editor.
EDIT / EDLIN: Very basic text editor(s); EDLIN is in earlier versions.
FC: File compare utility.
FDISK: Partitions fixed disks.
FIND: Find text in files.
FORMAT: Formats disks.
JOIN: Joins a drive letter to a subdirectory.
LABEL: Set or remove a disk volume label.
MEM: Display memory usage.
MODE: Set modes for system devices.
MORE: Display output one screen at a time.
MOVE: Move files from one directory to another.
PRINT: Print spooler.
REPLACE: Replace files.
SHARE: File sharing and locking support.
SORT: Sorts input.
SUBST: Substitutes a drive letter for a subdirectory.
SYS: Transfers the system files to another drive to make it bootable.
TREE: Display a directory tree.
XCOPY: Extended file copy.

Standard DOS device drivers:

ANSI.SYS: ANSI console driver.
EMM386.EXE: Expanded memory manager.
HIMEM.SYS: Extended memory manager.
RAMDRIVE.SYS / VDISK.SYS: RAM disk; VDISK.SYS is in older versions of PC DOS.

References

DOS files